Paskoje is a Serbo-Croatian masculine given name, derived from Latin Paschalis (Pascal, Pasquale), Slavicized with the ending -oje. Notable people with the name include:

Paskoje Sorkočević
Paskoje Miličević Mihov
Paskoje Primojević